Battle Beast may refer to:

Battle Beast (video game), fighting game released for the PC
Battle Beast (band), Finnish metal band
Battle Beast (album), self-titled album of the band above 
Battle Beasts, line of small figurine action figure toys, in the form of an anthropomorphised animal with body armor and a unique weapon

See also
Beasts of battle, poetic trope in Old English and Old Norse literature
Battle Bison beast, (from Sumerian gud-alim: bison bull), in Sumerian mythology, one of the Heroes slain by Ninurta, patron god of Lagash, in Mesopotamia